99 Cents Only Stores (also branded as The 99 Store, and 99¢ Only Stores) is an American price-point retailer chain based in Commerce, California. It offers "a combination of closeout branded merchandise, general merchandise and fresh foods." The store initially offered all products at 99¢ or less. The base price was raised to 99.99¢ in 2008, and products have been introduced at higher prices.  Founded by Dave Gold in 1982, there are stores located in California,  Arizona, Nevada, and Texas. The company also operates Bargain Wholesale, which sells wholesale to retailers across the United States and exports to more than 15 countries from showrooms in Los Angeles. It also exhibits at trade shows in Las Vegas and Chicago.

History

Early history
99 Cents Only Stores dates back to the 1960s when the company’s founder, Dave Gold, inherited a tiny liquor store in downtown Los Angeles and decided to run a test by selling bottles of wine at a fixed price-point of 99 cents. The test was an instant success, and Dave thought that selling everything in the store for 99 cents would be hugely popular.

"Whenever I'd put wine or cheese on sale for $1.02 or 98 cents, it never sold out," Gold said in a 2001 interview with The Los Angeles Times. "When I put a 99 cent sign on anything, it was gone in no time. I realized it was a magic number."

On a “lucky” Friday, August 13, 1982, Dave and Sherry Gold opened the first 99 Cents Only Store in Los Angeles. To celebrate the grand opening, Dave decided to sell television sets for only 99 cents to the first 13 families. More than 300 people showed up to stand in line and wait for the store to open. The huge line caught the media’s attention, and more than 10 TV outlets covered the store’s first day. The success of this first grand opening inspired a tradition, with new stores continuing for years to offer 99-cent deals for televisions and other products.

2000s
In November 2003, a more flexible pricing structure was implemented where items are sold for prices lower than 99 cents (for example, 69 or 49 cents). The management believed that this will permit better management of commodity price increases.

In September 2007, the company raised its prices by $0.0099 - about 1%, e.g. from 99 cents to 99.99 cents—the first increase in the history of the franchise—to combat "dramatically rising costs and inflation." However, the store now carries some items that are over the .9999 price point; such as $1.99 and $2.99

Despite having announced on September 18, 2008, that the company would close all stores in Texas, in February 2009, the company decided that it will close only one-third of its Texas stores. The company quoted a rise in sales, and plans to keep the stores open, as long as the stores remain profitable.

2010s

In October 2011, the company agreed to a $1.6-billion buy-out by private equity firm Ares Management and the CPP Investment Board.
 The deal was completed on January 13, 2012. New ownership decided to lay off 172-plus employees in October 2013.
 The Gold family ended their involvement with the company in January 2013.

In popular culture
99 Cents Only Stores advertises that it is open "9 days a week", often invoking humorous commentary on holidays with products sold for 99 cents. One advertisement wished Joan Rivers "Happy 99th Facelift"; another congratulated the "Dodgers on Losing 99 Games." The company also celebrates the 99th birthday of public figures and names 99-year-old individuals as honorary spokespersons.

Photographer Andreas Gursky's diptych of the inside of the Hollywood, California, 99 Cents Only store became at the time of its sale in February 2007, the most expensive photograph ever sold, being auctioned for $3.3 million.

99 Cents Only Stores trucks and vans state that "Our drivers carry 99 cents only".

99 Cents Only Stores allows returns of up to nine items within nine days of purchase and are typically open from 9 a.m. to 9 p.m., although individual stores may open at 8 a.m. or close at 10 p.m.

The store mottos include: "Do the 99", "Low prices are born here, and raised elsewhere", featuring a picture of a baby chick.

A 99 Cents Only store was featured in scenes in the 2002 movie Punch-Drunk Love.

Grand Theft Auto: San Andreas 69 Cent Stores are a parody of 99 Cents Only Stores.

In 2016, late night talk show Jimmy Kimmel Live! aired a sketch parodying the 99 Cents Only Store called The 50 Cent Store featuring American rapper Curtis "50 Cent" Jackson.

References

External links

Official 99¢ Only Stores website
 
 Market Intelligence Center
 

Variety stores
Discount stores of the United States
Retail companies based in California
Companies based in Los Angeles County, California
Companies formerly listed on the New York Stock Exchange
Commerce, California
Retail companies established in 1969
1969 establishments in California
Economy of the Southwestern United States
2012 mergers and acquisitions
Private equity portfolio companies
Privately held companies based in California
CPP Investment Board companies